Rick McCarthy may refer to:

Rick McCarthy, character in Dreamcatcher (2003 film)
Rick McCarthy, character, see List of Alias characters

See also
Richard McCarthy (disambiguation)